Lake Beyşehir National Park, established in 1993, is a national park in Konya Province, central Turkey.

Geography
The national park is located within the districts Beyşehir and Hüyük of Konya Province. It is bordered by the Lake Beyşehir in the west, Beyşehir in the south and Hüyük in the north. Lake Beyşehir is Turkey's third biggest lake, and the biggest freshwater lake.

Ecosystem

Flora
The national park habitats 85 families, 305 genera, 545 species, 54 subspecies and 140 varieties within its boundaries. 88 of the 560 taxa in the park area are endemic. Some plants spread in and around the protected area are Turkish cedar, (Cedrus libani), common juniper (Juniperus communis), Phoenicean juniper (Juniperus phoenicea), fir (Abies), pine (Pinus), kermes oak (Quercus coccifera), ash tree (Fraxinus), walnut tree (Juglans), mulberry (Morus), male fern (Dryopteris filix-mas), windflower (Anemone nemorosa), poppy (Papaver somniferum), dyer's madder (Rubia tinctorum), sage (Salvia), snowdrop (Galanthus) and cyclamen.

Fauna
Lake Beyşehir and its creeks are habitat for 16 freshwater fish species including zander, carp and zarte.

The lake is quite important for water birds. There are 153 bird species in the park area. Bird species such as coot, pelican, heron, grebe, mallard, little grebe and tufted duck are observed on the islets and the shallow banks of the lake.

The area around the lake is also rich in species of amphibians, reptiles and mammals. It is habitat for three amphibian, 14 reptile and 34 mammal species.

Facilities and recreation
The national park offers opportunities for diverse recreational outdoor activities such as trekking, hiking and mountain biking. There is also possibility of boat ride on the lake.

There are picnic areas, off-road park, campgrounds for tent and camper in the park.  The park has no lodging facilities. The nearby town Beyşehir provides hotels, motels and hostels to stay.

Best time to perform recreational activities in the national park is between May and October.

Access
State highway  between Konya and Isparta runs through the national park.

See also
Eflatun Pınar (literally: Plato's Spring) is a historic place inside the national park with a stone-built pool monument from Hittites.

References

National parks of Turkey
Geography of Konya Province
Tourist attractions in Konya Province
1993 establishments in Turkey
Protected areas established in 1993
Beyşehir District
Hüyük District